Omprakesh Bankelal Agrawal also known as either Omprakash Agarwal or Omprakash Agrawal (27 April 1955 – 15 May 1994), was an Indian professional snooker player.

Career
Born in 1955, Agrawal played at the 1984 World Amateur Snooker Championship, where he won seven of nine matches to qualify in second place from his group, before defeating Dilwyn John of Wales and Jon Wright of England to reach the final. There, he faced defending world champion Terry Parsons of Wales, winning the match 11–7 to become World Amateur champion. He also became the first snooker player outside the UK to win an amateur snooker world championship.

This enabled Agrawal to compete on the sport's main tour for the 1985/1986 season. He won his first-ever professional match, beating Paul Watchorn 5–2 in the Matchroom Trophy, but lost by the same scoreline in the next round to Danny Fowler. Agrawal followed this with victories over Jim Rempe and John Dunning in qualifying for the 1985 Grand Prix as he reached the last 64; at that stage, however, he was whitewashed 0–5 by the incumbent World Champion Steve Davis.

In the 1985 UK Championship, he was drawn against Stephen Hendry in the first round, and despite having lost the first frame, compiled a break of 110 in defeating him 9–2. In the next round, he led Mario Morra 8–6, but could not prevent an 8–9 loss.

Further defeats to Graham Miles in the British Open and Steve Newbury in the 1986 World Championship followed, but Agrawal's performances were sufficient for him to finish his first season ranked 89th.

The 1986/1987 season brought poor form; he played in only the International Open, the Grand Prix, the UK Championship, the Classic and the British Open, losing his first match in each tournament. Agrawal resigned his professional status in 1987.

Death
Agrawal died of cancer in May 1994, aged 39.

Career finals

Amateur finals: 1 (1 title)

References

Indian snooker players
1955 births
1994 deaths
Recipients of the Arjuna Award
Sportspeople from Mumbai
Deaths from cancer in India
Recipients of the Padma Shri in sports